Elections to Scottish Borders Council were held on 3 May 2012, the same day as the other Scottish local government elections. The election used the 11 wards created as a result of the Local Governance (Scotland) Act 2004, with each ward electing three or four Councillors using the single transferable vote system, a form of proportional representation, with 34 Councillors elected.

The election saw the Scottish Conservative Party remain the largest party on the Council though they lost 1 seat. The Scottish National Party replaced the Scottish Liberal Democrats as the second largest party by gaining 3 seats at the expense of the latter. The Lib Dems were reduced to 6 seats. Independents increased their numbers to 7 seats while the Borders Party retained their 2 seats.

Following the election the Scottish National Party formed a coalition with the support of the Independents and the Liberal Democrats. The Borders Party are also supporting this administration. This replaced the previous Conservative-Lib Dem-Independent coalition which existed from 2007-2012.

Election results

Note: "Votes" are the first preference votes. The net gain/loss and percentage changes relate to the result of the previous Scottish local elections on 3 May 2007. This may differ from other published sources showing gain/loss relative to seats held at dissolution of Scotland's councils.

Ward results

Tweeddale West
2007: 1xLib Dem; 1xCon; 1xSNP
2012: 1xLib Dem; 1xCon; 1xSNP
2007-2012 Change: No change

Tweeddale East
2007: 1xSNP; 1xLib Dem; 1xCon
2012: 1xSNP; 1xCon; 1xLib Dem
2007-2012 Change: No change

Galashiels and District
2007: 1xSNP; 1xLib Dem; 1xCon; 1xBP
2012: 2xSNP; 1xBP; 1xIndependent
2007-2012 Change: SNP and Independent gain one seat from Lib Dem and Con

 = Outgoing Councillor from a different Ward.

Selkirkshire
2007: 1xLib Dem; 1xCon; 1xSNP
2012: 1xCon; 1xLib Dem; 1xIndependent
2007-2012 Change: Independent gain one seat from SNP

Leaderdale and Melrose
2007: 1xIndependent; 1xLib Dem; 1xBP
2012: 1xIndependent; 1xBP; 1xSNP
2007-2012 Change: SNP gain one seat from Lib Dem

Mid Berwickshire
2007: 1xLib Dem; 1xSNP; 1xCon
2012: 1xSNP; 1xCon; 1xLib Dem
2007-2012 Change: No change

East Berwickshire
2007: 1xIndependent; 1xCon; 1xLib Dem
2012: 1xIndependent; 1xCon; 1xSNP
2007-2012 Change: SNP gain one seat from Lib Dem

Kelso and District
2007: 1xLib Dem; 1xCon; 1xIndependent
2012: 2xCon; 1xLib Dem
2007-2012 Change: Con gain from Independent

Jedburgh and District
2007: 2xCon; 1xSNP
2012: 1xSNP; 1xCon; 1xIndependent
2007-2012 Change: Independent gain one seat from Con

Hawick and Denholm
2007: 1xCon; 1xIndependent; 1xLib Dem
2012: 1xIndependent; 1xCon; 1xSNP
2007-2012 Change: SNP gain one seat from Lib Dem

Hawick and Hermitage
2007: 1xIndependent; 1xCon; 1xLib Dem
2012: 1xIndependent; 1xLib Dem; 1xCon
2007-2012 Change: No change

Post Election Changes
† On 4 February 2012 Leaderdale and Melrose Borders Party Cllr Nicholas Watson resigned his seat on the Council to pursue employment in Cumbria. The by-election was won by Iain Gillespie, also of the Borders Party, on 2 May 2013. Borders Party's Iain Gillespie wins Leaderdale and Melrose by-election
†† On 29 July 2013 Tweedale West Conservative and Unionist Party Cllr Nathaniel Buckingham resigned his seat on the Council due to work pressures and family commitments. The by-election was held on 10 October 2013 and was held by the Conservatives Keith Cockburn. Tweeddale West by-election result 2013 - Scottish Borders Council
††† On 22 February 2014 Hawick and Denholm Conservative and Unionist Cllr Zandra Elliot died.Hawick 'ambassador' Zandra Elliot dies A by-election was held to fill the vacancy and was won by the Independent Watson McAteer.
†††† On 2 June 2016 Leaderdale and Melrose SNP Cllr Jim Torrance resigned from the party and became an Independent citing lack of support from Christine Grahame MSP over the Council's plans to house the Great Tapestry of Scotland at Tweedbank.SBC Councillor quits over tapestry

By-elections since 2012

References 

2012
2012 Scottish local elections